Ogun Records is a jazz record label created in London in 1973 by South African expatriate bassist Harry Miller, his wife Hazel Miller, and sound engineer Keith Beal. They recorded British avant-garde jazz musicians Keith Tippett, Mike Osborne, Elton Dean, Lol Coxhill, Harry Beckett, Trevor Watts  and their collaborations with expatriate South Africans, including the Blue Notes, Chris McGregor, Dudu Pukwana, Mongezi Feza, Louis Moholo, and Johnny Dyani in groups like McGregor's Brotherhood of Breath, Dean's Ninesense, and Miller's Isipingo.

The label did not have any releases for several years, beginning in 1980, during which the Millers lived in the Netherlands. Harry Miller was killed in a car accident in 1983. Hazel Miller started releasing new titles on LP in 1986, with help from John Jack of Cadillac Records, and in 1990 switched the format of releases to CD starting with Elton Dean's Unlimited Saxophone Company. Since then, almost every year has seen one to three new additions to the CD catalog. Most are new or unreleased recordings, and some are CD editions of the earlier LP releases.

Discography

LP

CD

See also
 List of record labels

References 

British jazz record labels
Ogun Records